Vernon is a city in Lamar County, Alabama, United States. The city is the county seat of Lamar County, and previously served as the seat of its two predecessors, Jones County (not to be confused with Covington County), which briefly existed in 1867, and for Sanford County from 1868 until it was renamed Lamar in 1877. It incorporated in 1870. At the 2010 census the population was 2,000, down from 2,143 in 2000. It is the largest city in Lamar County as of 2010, and previously held the distinction in 1880 and from 1960 to 1990, falling to 2nd place in 2000 behind Sulligent, but since reclaiming the title.

Geography 
Vernon is located at  (33.756414, -88.111409).

Climate

History 
The city of Vernon was originally known as Swayne Courthouse; it was named for the head of the Freedman's Bureau, General Wager Swayne, who served in the Chattahoochee District of the state. Many of the records of this time were lost, when the courthouse burned in 1866. The name of the town was changed in 1868 to Vernon after Edmund Vernon.

Both before and after the Civil war, the economy of Vernon was based on timber, agriculture, and milling. After the Civil War, the plantations were sold off to timber interests, which eliminated many jobs. Since the end of Reconstruction, Vernon has experienced waves of manufacturing with textile factories being introduced in the early 20th century. All of these textile factories no longer exist. Some manufacturers remain, such as Marathon, an international manufacturer of trash compactors.

Demographics

2000 census
At the 2000 census there were 2,143 people in 953 households, including 630 families, in the city. The racial makeup of the city was 86.19% White, 12.65% Black or African American, 0.23% Native American, 0.05% Asian, and 0.89% from two or more races. 0.65% of the population were Hispanic or Latino of any race.
Of the 953 households 31.3% had children under the age of 18 living with them, 45.5% were married couples living together, 18.4% had a female householder with no husband present, and 33.8% were non-families.  32.3% of households were one person and 15.6% were one person aged 65 or older.  The average household size was 2.19 and the average family size was 2.75.

The age distribution was 24.1% under the age of 18, 8.5% from 18 to 24, 26.9% from 25 to 44, 23.0% from 45 to 64, and 17.5% 65 or older.  The median age was 38 years.  For every 100 females, there were 83.0 males.  For every 100 females age 18 and over, there were 78.2 males.

The median household income was $27,344 and the median family income  was $36,618. Males had a median income of $31,550 versus $19,470 for females. The per capita income for the city was $14,784. About 10.7% of families and 15.6% of the population were below the poverty line, including 19.2% of those under age 18 and 21.6% of those age 65 or over.

2010 census
At the 2010 census there were 2,000 people in 890 households, including 569 families, in the city. The racial makeup of the city was 79.4% White, 18.1% Black or African American, 0.3% Native American, 0.0% Asian, and 1.2% from two or more races. 1.7% of the population were Hispanic or Latino of any race.
Of the 890 households 30.4% had children under the age of 18 living with them, 41.1% were married couples living together, 17.9% had a female householder with no husband present, and 36.1% were non-families. 33.4% of households were one person and 14.2% were one person aged 65 or older. The average household size was 2.25 and the average family size was 2.86.

The age distribution was 26.3% under the age of 18, 8.2% from 18 to 24, 23.6% from 25 to 44, 26.3% from 45 to 64, and 15.8% 65 or older. The median age was 38.1 years. For every 100 females, there were 81.8 males. For every 100 females age 18 and over, there were 79.7 males.

The median household income was $34,236 and the median family income  was $43,950. Males had a median income of $41,339 versus $21,331 for females. The per capita income for the city was $16,814. About 15.9% of families and 19.6% of the population were below the poverty line, including 22.2% of those under age 18 and 10.6% of those age 65 or over.

2020 census

As of the 2020 United States census, there were 1,921 people, 923 households, and 535 families residing in the city.

Notable people 
 Reuben Houston "Rube" Burrow, the most wanted outlaw of the late 1880s, he committed a series of train robberies along with his younger brother James Buchanan "Jim" Burrow.
 Dixie McArthur, former Major League Baseball pitcher
 Terry Moore, born in Vernon, major league baseball player
 Guy Morton, born in Vernon, major league baseball player
 Dan Penn, songwriter, born in Vernon.
Brandy Reeves
 William Hall Smith, president of Mississippi State University from 1916 to 1920.

References

External links

Cities in Alabama
Cities in Lamar County, Alabama
County seats in Alabama